Guion (also known as Bruens Crossroads, Bruins or Cross Roads) is an unincorporated community in Greene Township, Parke County, in the U.S. state of Indiana. It is near the western intersection of Indiana State Road 59 and Indiana State Road 236.

History
Guion was platted in 1882. The community was named in honor of William Howe Guion, a railroad promoter. A post office was established at Guion in 1878, and remained in operation until it was discontinued in 1943.

Geography

References

Unincorporated communities in Indiana
Unincorporated communities in Parke County, Indiana